Lawrence H. Livingston (November 5, 1940 – September 28, 2018) was a decorated  United States Marine Corps Major General. Livingston was a combat veteran — receiving the Navy Cross for his heroic actions during the Vietnam War, as well as the Silver Star, two Legions of Merit, four Bronze Stars and five Purple Hearts.

Marine Corps Career
Livingston enlisted in the United States Marine Corps in 1960 and completed multiple tours of duty with 1st Marine Division in the Republic of Vietnam, where he served as a squad leader, platoon sergeant, platoon commander and company gunnery sergeant. Livingston was wounded multiple times and awarded the Bronze Star Medal with Valor device. Livingston was commissioned as a second lieutenant in 1968 via the Meritorious NCO Program. Upon completion of The Basic School in 1968, he was assigned to the 5th MEB, and 3rd Marine Division, where he served as a platoon commander. Livingston served a second tour in Vietnam as an Advisor with the Vietnamese Marine Corps. Livingston was awarded the Silver Star Medal for heroism in April 1972 and the Navy Cross for heroism in July 1972. Upon his return from Vietnam, Livingston was assigned to the Marine Corps Recruit Depot San Diego as company commander, battalion operations officer and regimental operations officer. In late 1976, he was assigned to the 5th Marine Regiment where he served as company commander, battalion operations officer, and battalion executive officer. He was promoted to lieutenant colonel in October 1983. Livingston served as executive officer of the 6th Marine Regiment and then two years as commanding officer of 3rd Battalion, 4th Marines. he was promoted to colonel in September 1989. Livingston assumed command of 6th Marines on June 13, 1990. Livingston relinquished command of 6th Marines on February 27, 1992.

His numerous staff assignments include student at Armed Forces Staff College, Norfolk,Virginia (1979 to 1980); Tactics Group Chief and Operations Officer of The Basic School, Marine Corps Combat Development Command (1980 to 1983); Operations Officer, Marine Aircraft Group 15, 1st Marine Aircraft Wing; student at the National War College in Washington, D.C (1986 to 1987) and Assistant Deputy Chief of Staff for Force Structure Implementation, Plans, Policies and Operations Department, Headquarters Marine Corps (1992 to 1995). He was selected for promotion to brigadier general in December 1991 and promoted to major general in February 1995. He assumed his last assignment in June 1995 as the Commanding General, 2nd Marine Division, Camp Lejeune, North Carolina.

Awards and honors
His personal decorations include:

Navy Cross citation
LIVINGSTON, LAWRENCE H.
Captain, U.S. Marine Corps
Advisor (Attached), 1st Vietnamese Marine Corps Infantry Battalion
Date of Action: July 11, 1972

The Navy Cross is presented to Lawrence H. Livingston, Captain, U.S. Marine Corps, for extraordinary heroism on 11 July 1972 while serving as Senior Advisor to the 1st Vietnamese Marine Corps Infantry Battalion during a heliborne assault into enemy-held territory northeast of Quang Tri City, Republic of Vietnam. When the battalion encountered unexpectedly heavy enemy fire while disembarking into the landing zone, and sustained numerous casualties, Captain Livingston moved throughout the hasty positions taken by the scattered and hesitant element and formed the Marines into an assault force. Despite the continuing heavy concentration of hostile fire, he began the assault on the initial objective - a treeline approximately 50 yards distant. Although blown from his feet by explosions and periodically delayed to reform and redirect his casualty-riddled force, he forged ahead, leading the Vietnamese Marines into the enemy-infested trench lines of the objective and a subsequent hand-to-hand battle. Upon seizure of the initial portion of the trench line, Captain Livingston shed his combat equipment, emerged from the trench line, and exposed himself to a hail of enemy fire to reach and carry his wounded naval gunfire spotter to a position of relative safety. Captain Livingston's repeated acts of heroism in the face of heavy enemy fire reflected great credit upon himself and the Marine Corps and were in keeping with the highest traditions of the United States Naval Service.

Silver Star citation
The President of the United States of America takes pleasure in presenting the Silver Star to Captain Lawrence Herbert Livingston (MCSN: 0-107447), United States Marine Corps, for conspicuous gallantry and intrepidity in action while serving in the Republic of Vietnam on 12 April 1972 as the Assistant United States Marine Advisor to the First Infantry Battalion, Vietnamese Marine Corps. Captain Livingston and the company of Marines with which he was participating in a search operation, having just taken a prisoner for interrogation, were ambushed by a Vietnamese platoon. Within thirty seconds intense enemy fire had killed the Vietnamese Officer in Charge and killed or wounded all but two of the friendly forces in the immediate area. Without hesitation and with complete disregard for his own safety, Captain Livingston braved intense enemy fire to recover the body of the Vietnamese officer and to remove several wounded to a protected area. Then, realizing that the prisoner would be able to provide intelligence, he questioned him and learned the enemy disposition. By organizing the resistance of his Vietnamese comrades, he ensured that the company was able to drive off the North Vietnamese. Captain Livingston's courageous and decisive action immediately following the death of the Vietnamese commander not only resulted in the withdrawal of the enemy platoon, saving an untold number of friendly casualties, but enabled the Vietnamese Marines, with the aid of supporting artillery fire, to inflict serious damage to a larger enemy unit nearby. Captain Livingston's devotion to duty, courage under fire and exemplary professionalism were in keeping with the highest traditions of the United States Naval Service.

See also
List of Navy Cross recipients for the Vietnam War
List of 2nd Marine Division commanders

References

External links

1940 births
2018 deaths
Recipients of the Navy Cross (United States)
Recipients of the Silver Star
Recipients of the Legion of Merit
Recipients of the Gallantry Cross (Vietnam)
United States Marine Corps generals
United States Marine Corps personnel of the Vietnam War
United States Marine Corps personnel of the Gulf War
Military personnel from Ohio
People from Defiance, Ohio
Joint Forces Staff College alumni
National War College alumni